Viripara Weir is a Diversion weir constructed across  Upper Kallar river which is a tributary of Pooyankutty river in Mankulam village of Idukki district in Kerala, India. The water flows from the dam to Menachery river and flows through the taluk of Devikulam. The Viripara weir is constructed as an augmentation scheme to Neriamangalam Hydro Electric Project. Upper Kallar, a tributary of Pooyankutty river is diverted in to Kallarkutty reservoir by a low diversion weir at Viripara along with a short diversion tunnel.

Specifications
Latitude : N	
Longitude: E	
Panchayath	: Mankulam	
Village	: Mankulam		
District	: Idukki
River Basin	: Periyar	
River : 	Upper Kallar
Release from Dam to river	: Menachery ar
Type of Dam : Masonry
Classification : Weir
Full Reservoir Level ( FRL) : EL 1141.59 m
Maximum Water Level (MWL)
Storage at FRL : Diversion only
Height from deepest foundation :4.57m
Length	
Taluk through which release flows	: Devikulam	
Spillway	: Overflow weir
Year of completion	:1961	
Crest Level	: EL 1141.59 m
Name of Project	: Neriamangalam HEP	
River Outlet	: Nil
Purpose of Project : Hydro Power

Tourism
The Dam site is a favourite picnic spot and there are two waterfalls called Viripara Falls  and Nakshathrakuthu Falls.

References

Dams completed in 1961
Dams in Idukki district
Dams in Kerala
20th-century architecture in India